Derrick Clark may refer to:

 Derrick Clark (American football) (born 1971), American football running back
 Derrick Clark (footballer) (1935–1985), English footballer
 Derrick Clark (basketball) (born 1971), American college basketball coach